ALAT or Alat may refer to:
Arun Alat, Indian singer/musician
Alanine transaminase (ALAT), an enzyme
Advanced load address table (ALAT), a functional unit in the Intel Itanium processor architecture
French Army Light Aviation (Aviation légère de l’armée de Terre, ALAT)
Alat, Russia, a rural locality in the Republic of Tatarstan, Russia
Alat, alternative spelling of Olot, a town in Uzbekistan
Ələt, a port town in Azerbaijan
Alat tribe, a Turkic nomadic tribe